The Renault Vel Satis is an executive car that was produced by the French manufacturer Renault, launched at the 2001 Geneva Motor Show to replace the already discontinued Safrane. It was previously revealed as a concept car in 1998, at the Paris Motor Show. However, the following production model does not have very much in common with it.

A specially prepared Vel Satis was used by the President of France until 2009. It is still used on ceremonial occasions. The car was Renault's flagship model at the time, and the first Renault to be offered with adaptive cruise control as supplied by Robert Bosch GmbH.

Etymology
The name Vel Satis is a composite of elements of the words Velocity and Satisfaction.

Overview

The Vel Satis is distinguished by its unusual height (13 cm higher than a Safrane), which benefits interior space but results in proportions some viewed as being ungainly. In September 2002, Car described it as "ugly and very French." Design commentator Stephen Bayley decided that the problem with the car was that it was "not ugly enough."

Patrick Le Quément, Renault's design chief, explained that the car was intended to have physical presence, rather than aspiring to classical elegance like the 1930s Reinastella. Renault's stated intention was to target less conformist, selective modern customers who were identified as "distancing themselves from the conventional saloon."

The Vel Satis was an attempt to redefine the prestige car in French terms. The Vel Satis is seen in films, such as The Da Vinci Code and Mr. Bean's Holiday, as well as being famous in pop culture such as the Cannes Film Festival.

The Vel Satis is also used as a Head of State car of France, being used by various presidents and is occasionally still in use. It was the second ever car to receive a five star Euro NCAP safety crash test rating after the Laguna II.

The Vel Satis was available with a variety of engines: 
 2.0 T 16 valve 4-cylinder
 3.5 24 valve V6-cylinder
 2.0 dCi 16 valve 4-cylinder
 2.2 dCi 16 valve 4-cylinder
 3.0 dCi 24 valve V6-cylinder

The Vel Satis shares its platform with the Laguna II and Espace IV and was produced on the same assembly line in Sandouville, France.

Reviews of the car were critical of its ride and its handling but noted the car was quiet under most conditions. "The gearbox is prone to considerable hunting in its quest to deliver power, at which point engine noise intrudes more than anticipated, and the change itself is by no means the smoothest in the class."

The reviewer noted that the V6 diesel engine was better suited to the car's "lounge lizard pretensions" but that "all of which conspires to make the car's ride quality even more of a disappointment." The ride quality was described as feeling "over tough at pottering speeds, but displays a tendency to disintegrate into chop and judder when confronted with anything other than the smoothest of surfaces."

In March 2005, Renault UK decided not to develop an RHD version of the facelifted Vel Satis, as sales of the model had been poor in the United Kingdom since launch. Although 3,500 sales were predicted, only a third of these were achieved. This came only two years after the Avantime coupé/MPV, which was equally ambitious in its design, was discontinued by Renault.

The 2005 model year Vel Satis featured an reprofiled front grille section, giving it an appearance similar to more recent concept cars from the brand. On August 27, 2009, Renault ended production of the Vel Satis. Overall, Renault lost an estimated €18,710 per vehicle produced.

The Renault Latitude is considered a replacement in Africa, Asia, the Persian Gulf states, Mexico or Russia, because of its similar dimensions and class to the Vel Satis.

References

External links

Renault Vel Satis - Concept Car Database
Vel-Satis.org (UK site by Vel Satis owners, for Vel Satis owners - news, articles, technical, blog and forum)

Vel Satis
Cars introduced in 2001
Cars discontinued in 2009

Euro NCAP executive cars
Front-wheel-drive vehicles
Flagship vehicles
Hatchbacks
Executive cars